The Sima Valley is a river valley in the municipality of Eidfjord in Vestland county, Norway. The valley then runs west along the river to the Sima Hydroelectric Power Station at the head of the Simadal Fjord, where the river empties into the fjord. Norwegian County Road 103 runs through part of the valley and then continues along the south side of the fjord.

The Sima Valley is known for its waterfalls, including Rembesdal Falls (Rembesdalsfossen) and Skykkjedal Falls (Skykkjedalsfossen). It suffered catastrophic floods in 1893 and 1937. The valley had a population of 10 in 2017.

References

Eidfjord
Valleys of Vestland